Decahydroisoquinoline is a nitrogen-containing heterocycle with the chemical formula .  It is the saturated form of isoquinoline.

Decahydroisoquinoline can be formed by the hydrogenation of isoquinoline or tetrahydroisoquinoline.

Isomers
There are four stereoisomers of decahydroisoquinoline which differ by the configuration of the two carbon atoms at the ring fusion:

Occurrence
The decahydroisoquinoline occurs naturally in some alkaloids, including gephyrotoxins and pumiliotoxin C which are found in amphibian skins.

A variety of pharmaceutical drugs include a decahydroisoquinoline ring system within their structure, including ciprefadol, dasolampanel, nelfinavir, saquinavir, and tezampanel.

References